Port Authority is the debut studio album by Canadian hip hop producer Marco Polo. It was released on Soulspazm and Rawkus Records on May 15, 2007. It is the first installment of the Port Authority series, followed by PA2: The Director's Cut in 2013.

Critical reception

Timmhotep Aku of XXL praised Marco Polo's decision to feature "some of the East Coast's finest vets and samples." Rowald Pruyn of RapReviews.com described him as "a one man band, creating instead of compiling." Jeff Weiss  of Stylus Magazine noted that he pays "homage to the latter Golden Age through scratched hooks, graveyard strings, and breakbeats redolent of worn vinyl and dust."

The album was nominated for Rap Recording of the Year at the 2008 Juno Awards.

Track listing

References

External links
 

2007 debut albums
Albums produced by Marco Polo
Marco Polo (producer) albums
Rawkus Records albums